Ballycastle United Football Club currently compete in the Coleraine and District Premier League, having formerly played at intermediate-level in the Premier division of the Ballymena & Provincial League in Northern Ireland.

External links
 Ballycastle United Official Club website
 nifootball.co.uk - (For fixtures, results and tables of all Northern Ireland amateur football leagues)

Association football clubs in Northern Ireland
Association football clubs in County Antrim
Ballycastle, County Antrim